The Information Technology Agreement (ITA) is a plurilateral agreement enforced by the World Trade Organization (WTO) and concluded in the Ministerial Declaration on Trade in Information Technology Products in 1996, and entered into force 1 July 1997. Since 1997, a formal Committee under the WTO watches over the following of the Declaration and its Implementations. The agreement was expanded in 2015.

The aim of the treaty is to lower all taxes and tariffs on information technology products by signatories to zero.

According to a 2017 study in the World Trade Review, the 2015 ITA expansion is "the most successful attempt at trade liberalization under the auspices of the WTO since its inception in 1995." The study credits the success of the negotiations to four factors: "a narrower scope without a single undertaking approach, a negotiating group that contained many but not all WTO members, a focus on tariffs rather than non-tariff barriers, and avoiding a nationalistic opposition."

References

External links
 .
 .
 
 

World Trade Organization agreements
Treaties entered into force in 1997
Treaties concluded in 1996
Treaties of Afghanistan
Treaties of Albania
Treaties of Australia
Treaties of Bahrain
Treaties of Canada
Treaties of the People's Republic of China
Treaties of Colombia
Treaties of Costa Rica
Treaties of the Dominican Republic
Treaties of Egypt
Treaties of El Salvador
Treaties of Georgia (country)
Treaties of Guatemala
Treaties of Honduras
Treaties of Iceland
Treaties of India
Treaties of Indonesia
Treaties of Israel
Treaties of Japan
Treaties of Jordan
Treaties of Kazakhstan
Treaties of South Korea
Treaties of Kyrgyzstan
Treaties of Malaysia
Treaties of Mauritius
Treaties of Moldova
Treaties of Montenegro
Treaties of Morocco
Treaties of New Zealand
Treaties of Nicaragua
Treaties of Norway
Treaties of Oman
Treaties of Panama
Treaties of Peru
Treaties of the Philippines
Treaties of Qatar
Treaties of Russia
Treaties of Saudi Arabia
Treaties of Seychelles
Treaties of Singapore
Treaties of Switzerland
Treaties of Tajikistan
Treaties of Thailand
Treaties of Turkey
Treaties of Ukraine
Treaties of the United Arab Emirates
Treaties of the United States
Treaties of Vietnam
Treaties entered into by the European Union
Treaties of Taiwan
Treaties of Hong Kong
Treaties of Macau